What Should You Do? is an American reality series that aired on Lifetime from April 2003 to January 2006.

Overview
Hosted by Leeza Gibbons, the program recreates real-life stories of life-threatening or emergency situations and dilemmas, such as a car plunging off a bridge into a river or getting kidnapped and locked in a trunk, while highlighting tips and advice from experts about how to best react.

References

External links
 

2003 American television series debuts
2006 American television series endings
2000s American reality television series
English-language television shows
Lifetime (TV network) original programming